Inodrillia acova is a species of sea snail, a marine gastropod mollusk in the family Horaiclavidae.

It was previously included within the family Turridae.

Description
The length of the shell attains 8.7 mm.

Distribution
This marine species occurs off the Florida Keys, USA, found at depths between 137 and 247 m

References

 Bartsch P., A Review of Some West Atlantic Turritid Mollusks. Memorias de la Sociedad Cubana de Historia Natural, 17 (2):81-122, plates 7-15

External links
 Rosenberg G., Moretzsohn F. & García E. F. (2009). Gastropoda (Mollusca) of the Gulf of Mexico, Pp. 579–699 in Felder, D.L. and D.K. Camp (eds.), Gulf of Mexico–Origins, Waters, and Biota. Biodiversity. Texas A&M Press, College Station, Texas
  Tucker, J.K. 2004 Catalog of recent and fossil turrids (Mollusca: Gastropoda). Zootaxa 682:1–1295.

acova